The M50 motorway is a C-shaped orbital motorway in Dublin and the busiest motorway in Ireland. The current route was built in various sections over the course of 27 years, from 1983 to 2010. It begins at Dublin Port, running northward through the Dublin Port Tunnel and along a portion of the Airport Motorway. It then turns west at its junction with the M1, circling the northern, western and southern suburbs of Dublin, before merging with the M11 at Shankill in South East Dublin. The road forms part of European route E01.

An orbital motorway for Dublin was first proposed in the Dublin Transportation Study of 1971. Construction began on the first section, the Western Parkway (J6-J11) in 1987, and opened to traffic in 1990. This was followed by the Northern Cross Route (J3-J6) in 1996, the Southern Cross Route (J11-J13) in 2001, and the Southeastern Motorway (J13-J17) in 2005. The M50 route was extended to Dublin Port in 2006, via a section of the 1985 Airport Motorway (up to then a part of the M1) and the newly opened Dublin Port Tunnel.

A massive upgrade project commenced in early 2006 due to the motorway's chronic capacity problems. Lanes were added J3-J13, and many of the low-capacity roundabout interchanges were replaced with free-flowing interchanges. These upgrades were completed in 2010.

Layout

The M50 was originally planned to divert traffic travelling on National Primary Routes away from the city (a full bypass of Dublin). Due to urban expansion and sprawl it now runs through Dublin's suburbs and serves as a route within Dublin, connecting the suburbs.

All of the National Primary Routes radiating from Dublin begin at their junctions with the M50. The junctions were originally in the form of grade-separated signal-controlled roundabout junctions, not free-flowing interchanges. The M50 mainline itself was free-flow through all junctions. The other primary routes served are the N1/M1 to Belfast/Dundalk/Newry, N2 to Derry/Monaghan, N3 to Cavan/Donegal/Navan, N4/M4 (N5) (M6) to Galway/Sligo/Westport, N7/M7 (M8) (M9) to Cork/Limerick/Waterford, and the N11/M11 to Wexford/Wicklow. Additional junctions along the motorway serve other suburbs of Dublin such as Ballymun, Blanchardstown, Cherrywood, Dundrum, Sandyford and Tallaght.

Most of these interchanges were subject to high levels of traffic congestion, as was the former toll-plaza north of the West-Link bridge. The busier roundabout junctions were signal-controlled, with tailbacks extending for several kilometres at rush hour. The most infamous was the Red Cow roundabout junction with the N7, formerly dubbed the "Mad Cow Roundabout". As well as being the junction of two of the busiest roads in the State, the Luas tram Red Line from Tallaght to the city centre used to cross two slip roads at-grade, before continuing city-bound in the median of the R110 (formerly N7). As part of the M50 upgrade works (see below), these at-grade crossings were removed, and in December 2008, the completely reconstructed interchange was open. This greatly reduced the congestion at the once-notorious traffic black-spot.

The roundabout at the N3 is also notable as the Royal Canal and the Dublin-Sligo railway line pass through its centre.

The original speed limit on the M50 was 70 mph (112 km/h). The Southern Cross Route from J12-J13 was given a lower limit of 60 mph (96 km/h), due to its more undulating, twisting route. The route from J3-J13 was changed to 100 km/h after the Republic of Ireland's speed limits became metric in 2005, while the Southeastern Motorway section (J13-J17) became 120 km/h. The Airport Motorway-Port Tunnel section of the route from J1-J3 has a speed limit of 80 km/h due to the closely packed junctions and heavy volume of weaving traffic. Average speed camera technology is in operation in the Port Tunnel section of the M50.

Junctions

The South Eastern Motorway section, a radial route, was originally meant to be part of the M11. It curves away from the city centre and instead joins the N11 at junction 17 heading south. The next opportunity to exit the motorway at the Bray North exit of the M11.

There is no Junction 8, the junction number having been reserved for a potential extension of the M7 motorway from Lucan/Clondalkin to Naas. This is unlikely to be built given that the N7 Naas Road has been upgraded to dual three lane with at grade junctions converted to grade-separated interchanges or left-in, left-out (LILOs) junctions. However, it is an objective of South Dublin County Council to construct a new junction and use to it provide local access to the Cloverhill area of Palmerstown. This is also very unlikely to happen as the NRA have stated they are against the provision of new interchanges on the existing M50 as they are seen to contribute to traffic congestion on the route and undermine its function as a motorway.

Future plans

Completion of Dublin's ring road by the building of an Eastern Bypass of the city has been proposed. This plan is controversial, as it would require a tunnel across Sandymount Strand to or possibly through Booterstown marsh bird sanctuary. A motorway reservation from Sandyford to Booterstown was included in the Dún Laoghaire–Rathdown Development Plan, with space allowed for an interchange where it crosses the N11. The Dublin Port Tunnel, which opened on 20 December 2006, would form the northern half of the Eastern bypass. This project was cancelled in 2009.

Another outer orbital road has been proposed for the Dublin region. It will, if approved, run approximately from Drogheda via Navan, Trim and Kilcock towards Naas.

See also
M50 Roma encampment
N40
Roads in Ireland
Motorways in Ireland
National secondary road
Regional road
European route E01

References

External links
Roads Act 1993 (Classification of National Roads) Order 2006 – Department of Transport
M50 Motorway Upgrade
Environmental Impact Statement on M50 Upgrade Scheme
Easytrip
eFlow

Motorways in the Republic of Ireland
Roads in County Dublin
Ring roads